Angelo Barretto (born September 29, 1969) is a Filipino race car driver.

He made his European debut in 1999, participating in the Group N class of the European Sportscar Endurance Championships. He and teammate Matthew Marsh drove a BMW M3 and were in the running for the Rookie Championship. They won at Spa-Francorchamps of Belgium, and later that year in the same series, Barretto made a startling solo-win at Misano in Italy, after which BMW awarded him the Sport Pokal trophy.

Barretto subsequently participated in various other series, including the Le Mans Classic held at the Circuit de la Sarthe, where his team won the Inaugural event, various FIA GT events, the Guia Race of the Macau Grand Prix, and the ALMS series in the United States.

External links 
Angelo Barretto driver profile on the FIA GT website.
Interview by Kym A. Sanchez.
Feature on Angelo Barretto's win at the Le Mans Classic. Racetrack/on race-site photos by Alexandra Cornish

Filipino racing drivers
1969 births
Living people
24 Hours of Spa drivers